The 2022–23 ICC Men's T20 World Cup Europe Qualifier is a cricket tournament that forms part of the qualification process for the 2024 ICC Men's T20 World Cup. In May 2022, the International Cricket Council (ICC) confirmed all the fixtures and venues for the three sub-regional Qualifiers.

The sub-regional phase of European qualification for the previous T20 World Cup was eventually cancelled due to the COVID-19 pandemic. As a result, only four teams had the opportunity to qualify from a regional finals event. Jersey and Germany progressed from that event and thereby gained a bye through the sub-regional stage in the process for the 2024 T20 World Cup.

In this cycle, twenty-eight countries from the European region competed in the sub-regional phase of the tournament, divided into three events being played in June and July 2022. Qualifier C was the first event played, which took place in Belgium between 28 June and 4 July 2022. Qualifiers A and B followed, with both of them hosted in Finland between 12 and 31 July 2022.

The winner of each sub-regional qualifier progressed to the regional final. Denmark became the first team to advance to the regional final, after they beat Portugal by nine wickets in the final of sub-regional Qualifier C. Italy were the second team to progress to the regional final, when they beat the Isle of Man by seven wickets in the final of sub-regional Qualifier A. Austria were the last team to qualify from the sub-regional matches, after beating Norway in the final of the sub-regional Qualifier B.

Since Scotland and Ireland did not qualify directly for the 2024 ICC Men's T20 World Cup, they will also play in the regional final. The regional final will be played in Edinburgh, Scotland, in July 2023. The winners and runners-up at the regional final will qualify for the 2024 ICC Men's T20 World Cup.

Teams

Qualifier A

Squads

Group 1

 Advanced to the final
 Advanced to the 3rd place playoff
 Advanced to the 5th place playoff
 Advanced to the 7th place playoff

Group 2 

 Advanced to the final
 Advanced to the 3rd place playoff
 Advanced to the 5th place playoff
 Advanced to the 7th place playoff

Play-offs

7th-place play-off

5th-place play-off

3rd-place play-off

Final

Qualifier B

Squads

Group 1

 Advanced to the final
 Advanced to the 3rd place playoff
 Advanced to the 5th place playoff
 Advanced to the 7th place playoff

Group 2

 Advanced to the final
 Advanced to the 3rd place playoff
 Advanced to the 5th place playoff
 Advanced to the 7th place playoff

Play-offs

7th-place play-off

5th-place play-off

3rd-place play-off

Final

Qualifier C

Squads

On 22 June 2022, Saud Munir replaced Amjad Khan in the Denmark squad due to work commitments.

Group 1 

 Advanced to the semi-finals
 Advanced to the 5th place semi-finals

Group 2

 Advanced to the semi-finals
 Advanced to the 5th place semi-finals

Consolation play-offs
Following a car accident on 1 July 2022 that involved three match officials, the ICC rescheduled the consolation play-off matches.

5th Place semi-finals

7th-place play-off

5th-place play-off

Play-offs

Semi-finals

3rd-place play-off

Final

Regional Final

 Advance to the 2024 ICC Men's T20 World Cup

References

External links
 Series home at ESPN Cricinfo (Qualifier A)
 Series home at ESPN Cricinfo (Qualifier B)
 Series home at ESPN Cricinfo (Qualifier C)

ICC Men's T20 World Cup Qualifier
Qualifiers
Associate international cricket competitions in 2022
Associate international cricket competitions in 2023
ICC Men's T20 World Cup Europe Qualifier
ICC Men's T20 World Cup Europe Qualifier
ICC Men's T20 World Cup Europe Qualifier